This is a list of all current and notable former bridges or other crossings of the Upper Mississippi River which begins at the Mississippi River's source and extends to its confluence with the Ohio River at Cairo, Illinois.

Crossings

Minnesota

Minnesota – Wisconsin

Iowa – Wisconsin

Iowa – Illinois

Missouri – Illinois

Confluence with the Ohio River (See List of crossings of the Lower Mississippi River)

See also
List of crossings of the Lower Mississippi River
List of crossings of the Ohio River
List of crossings of the Missouri River
List of locks and dams of the Upper Mississippi River

References

Minnesota DOT County Maps

External links
Road Bridge Info
Rail Bridge Info
Mississippi bridges
MSP Bridges

Mississippi River
River crossings
River crossings
River crossings
River crossings
River crossings